Andrena ovatula is a Palearctic species of mining bee.

References

External links
Images representing Andrena ovatula  

Hymenoptera of Europe
ovatula
Insects described in 1802